Senecio ilicifolius is a plant endemic to South Africa and belonging to the family Asteraceae.

It is found in the Eastern and Western Cape growing up to 1 meter tall, and readily identified by its rigid holly-like leaves. Its leaves are clasping, adnate and somewhat decurrent at the base, acute, sharply and coarsely toothed with revolute margins, glabrous and scabrous-dotted above, whitish felted below.

Senecio species are a rich source of alkaloids and 'Meyler's Side Effects of Herbal Medicines' lists S. ilicifolius as producing pterophine and senecionine. Senecionine is toxic and problematic for feed stock and human consumption, causing cirrhosis of the liver, has a melting point of 232° and is only slightly soluble in water. It is not destroyed by the baking of bread from flour using contaminated wheat.

References

External links
iSpot

Gallery

ilicifolius
Flora of Southern Africa